Ganadevata (People as God, first published 1942), is a Bengali novel written by Tarasankar Bandyopadhyay. The author received Jnanpith Award in 1966 for this novel. In this novel, Bandyopadhyay narrated the lives of Indian/Bengal villages and lives of the villagers affected by poverty, ignorance and primitive instinct. The novel has been translated into several languages. This novel was filmed as Ganadevata (film) in 1978 by Tarun Majumdar.

References 

 Sources
 
 
 

Bengali-language novels
1942 novels
Jnanpith Award-winning works